Frog's leg may refer to:
 Frog legs, delicacies of French and Cantonese cuisine. 
 Frog's Leg Gold Mine, a gold mine in Western Australia.